Björn Johnsson, better known by his stage name John De Sohn, is a Swedish DJ and music producer well known for his dance music with very strong pop crossover. He is signed to the Sony Music label.

De Sohn started at a very young age. He took part in and won a number of DJ Battles awards. De Sohn's first commercial success was in 2012 with "Long Time" featuring the vocals of Andreas Moe, followed in 2013 by the songs "Dance Our Tears Away", which featured the vocals of Kristin Amparo, and "Under the Sun (Where We Belong)", again with Moe.

Discography

Singles

Notes

Remixes

References

Swedish DJs
Living people
Electronic dance music DJs
Year of birth missing (living people)